Juan Salamanca (born 6 March 1967) is a Chilean table tennis player. He competed in the men's doubles event at the 1996 Summer Olympics.

References

1967 births
Living people
Chilean male table tennis players
Olympic table tennis players of Chile
Table tennis players at the 1996 Summer Olympics
Place of birth missing (living people)
Pan American Games medalists in table tennis
Pan American Games bronze medalists for Chile
Table tennis players at the 1995 Pan American Games
Medalists at the 1995 Pan American Games
20th-century Chilean people